Atzeneta d'Albaida is a municipality in the comarca of Vall d'Albaida, in the province of Valencia, in the Valencian Community, Spain.

Sights
 Church of Saint John the Baptist 
 Hermitage of Cristo del Calvario
 Nevera de Dalt
 Nevera de Baix

References 

Municipalities in the Province of Valencia
Vall d'Albaida